McLane is an American wholesale supply chain services company which distributes grocery and non-food to convenience stores, discount retailers, wholesale clubs, drug stores, military bases, quick service restaurants, and casual dining restaurants throughout the United States. It is also a wholesale distributor of distilled spirits, wine, and beer in some US states. McLane is organised in three segments: grocery distribution, serving about 49,000 retail locations, foodservice distribution, catering to about 36,500 chain restaurants, and beverage distribution, servicing about 24,900 retail locations in the Southeastern US and Colorado.

Walmart, McLane's former parent company, remains its largest client with approximately 25% of its 2017 revenues. Other significant customers include 7-Eleven and Yum! Brands, each of which accounted for approximately 11% of its 2017 revenues.

Mclane was founded in 1894 in Cameron, Texas and has grown from a local merchant to an international distribution and logistics company. The company is headquartered in Temple, Texas, and operates 80 grocery and foodservice distribution centers across the country, as well as one in Brazil.

McLane has been a wholly owned subsidiary of Berkshire Hathaway since 2003.

Key financial figures 
The grocery and foodservice businesses generate high sales volumes but very low profit margins. From the 2017 (and 2004) Berkshire Hathaway annual report, key figures are as follows:

Note: pre-tax earnings include $39 million from asset sales in 2017 and $19 million from the sale of a subsidiary in 2015. The first year is 2004 as it is the first full year of ownership by Berkshire Hathaway. Not all data are publicly available.

Corporate operations

McLane Company operates 21 grocery distribution centers and 18 foodservice distribution centers across the country.

The President & CEO of McLane Company since 2020 is Tony Frankenberger.

History

McLane started in 1894 when Robert McLane opened a small retail grocery store in downtown Cameron, Texas. In 1903, he expanded into wholesale trade, supplying grocery stores in neighboring towns via rail and horse-drawn wagons. During the 1920s through the 1940s, with the advent of the automobile and a robust highway system, his business grew rapidly to encompass much of the Central Texas region.

In 1966, McLane Company moved its operations to Temple, Texas, and began tailoring its warehouse operations and distribution methods to better accommodate the retail market, including the rapid growth of the convenience store market.

McLane Company pursued a plan of expansion beyond Texas beginning in 1976 under the leadership of Drayton McLane, Jr., the third generation of family leadership. By 1990, the company had established a national presence.

In December 1990, Drayton McLane sold McLane Company to Wal-Mart Stores, Inc. for 10.4 million shares of Wal-Mart stock and an undisclosed amount of cash.

McLane Company entered the foodservice business in December 2000, when it acquired certain assets from AmeriServe Food Distribution to create McLane Foodservice.

In May 2003, Berkshire Hathaway acquired McLane Company from Wal-Mart for $1.45 billion.

In 2012, McLane opened its 21st grocery distribution center in Republic, Missouri. This is a 350,000 square foot building with state of the art technology including the Schaefer Case Picking system. Their 18th and most recent foodservice distribution center was built in Manassas, Virginia in 2010.

In 2012, McLane acquired Meadowbrook Meat Company (MBM), a Foodservice distributor.

In 2017, McLane plans to open its 22nd grocery distribution center in Findlay, Ohio.

Customers

Retail chains that receive one or more product categories from McLane include Wal-Mart, Sam's Club, Walgreens, Pilot / Flying J, Kangaroo Express, Circle K, Wawa, 7-Eleven, ExxonMobil, Target Stores, Love's, Kmart, Hess, Family Dollar, and AAFES.

Restaurant chains supplied by McLane Foodservice are the Yum! Brands family of concepts: Taco Bell, KFC, Pizza Hut, and former Yum Concepts Long John Silvers/A&W Restaurants.
They also provide food to Sonic as of August 2010, Buffalo Wild Wings, Arby's, Del Taco, Denny's, Jack in the Box, Hardee's and Applebee's.

Specialty divisions and companies
McLane Company owns the following specialty divisions and subsidiary companies:

 McLane Foodservice, Inc. is a supplier of food and foodservice items to restaurants throughout the US, serving more than 20,000 customers.
 Salado Sales develops and markets private label products to McLane's convenience store customers. Its lines include various health and beauty care items, film and flash products, light bulbs, motor oil, and work gloves.
 C.D. Hartnett, Inc. is a grocery wholesaler based in Weatherford, Texas.  C.D. Hartnett supplies food service accounts, convenience stores, and independent grocers in Texas, Kansas, Oklahoma, and Louisiana. McLane Company acquired C.D. Hartnett in 2004.
 McCarty-Hull, Inc. is a grocery wholesaler based in Amarillo, Texas. McLane acquired McCarty-Hull in 2006.
 Empire Distributors is a wholesale alcoholic beverage distributor in the Southeast US. In 2010, McLane Company purchased Empire.
 MBM Foodservice, Rocky Mount, NC

References

Companies based in Texas
Temple, Texas
Business services companies established in 1894
1894 establishments in Texas
Multinational companies headquartered in the United States
Catering and food service companies of the United States
Berkshire Hathaway
2003 mergers and acquisitions
Wholesalers of the United States